Amir Deh (also Romanized as Amīr Deh) is a village in Sajjadrud Rural District, Bandpey-ye Sharqi District, Babol County, Mazandaran Province, Iran. At the 2006 census, its population was 200, in 50 families.

References 

Populated places in Babol County